Margaret Hughes is a former international lawn bowler from Zambia.

Margaret Hughes became a resident of Zambia in 1964 and began bowling in 1971, she made her debut for Zambia at the 1985 World Outdoor Bowls Championship.

She won a bronze medal in the pairs at the 1992 World Outdoor Bowls Championship in Ayr with Helen Graham. She also competed in the 1994 Commonwealth Games.

References

Zambian female bowls players
Zambian bowls players
Bowls players at the 1994 Commonwealth Games
Living people
Immigrants to Zambia
White Zambian people
Year of birth missing (living people)
Commonwealth Games competitors for Zambia